Ingrid Jacquemod (born 23 September 1978 in Bourg Saint Maurice) is a French alpine skier who grew up in Val-d'Isère. She has appeared in two Winter Olympics, in 2002 and 2006.

Olympics results
2006
Downhill – 16th
Super-G – 32nd
Giant slalom – 21st

2002
Downhill – 23rd
Super-G – 22nd

World championships
Jacquemod appeared at the World Championships since 2001, her best single race position being fifth, in the 2005 downhill race in Santa Caterina.

World Cup
Jacquemod made her World Cup debut on 21 November 1996 at the age of eighteen, in a giant slalom race in Park City, Utah. Her first finish was on 18 January the next year, where she finished 21st. Jacquemod has won one World Cup race, in January 2005 in a downhill race in Santa Caterina.

References

External links
 
 Official homepage 
 
 

1978 births
French female alpine skiers
Alpine skiers at the 2006 Winter Olympics
Alpine skiers at the 2002 Winter Olympics
Alpine skiers at the 2010 Winter Olympics
Olympic alpine skiers of France
People from Bourg-Saint-Maurice
Living people
Sportspeople from Savoie